Vera Zyatikova (born 5 May 1974) is a Belarusian-Russian cross-country skier. She competed in four events at the 2002 Winter Olympics.

Cross-country skiing results
All results are sourced from the International Ski Federation (FIS).

Olympic Games

World Championships

World Cup

Season standings

References

External links
 

1974 births
Living people
Belarusian female cross-country skiers
Olympic cross-country skiers of Belarus
Cross-country skiers at the 2002 Winter Olympics
People from Kemerovo
Sportspeople from Kemerovo Oblast
Universiade silver medalists for Russia
Universiade medalists in cross-country skiing
Russian female cross-country skiers
Competitors at the 2001 Winter Universiade